Brandon High School is a suburban public high school located in Brandon, Mississippi, United States. BHS serves grades 9 through 12 and is part of the Rankin County School District, serving students in the Brandon zone.

Athletics
Brandon athletic teams compete in Mississippi High School Athletics Association 6A Region 3.

State championships
Volleyball
2017 Mississippi 6A State Champions
2018 Mississippi 6A State Champions

Girls soccer
2018 Mississippi 6A State Champions

Baseball
1967 Mississippi A State Champions

Track and Field
2001 Boys Mississippi 5A State Champions(2017–18)
2003 Boys Mississippi 5A State Champions
2004 Boys Mississippi 5A State Champions
2005 Boys Mississippi 5A State Champions
2006 Boys Mississippi 5A State Champions
2010 Boys Mississippi 5A State Champions
2010 Girls Mississippi 5A State Champions

Demographics
As of the 2017-2018 school year, 834 of Brandon students were male and 814 were female. 1,096 identified as Caucasian, 481 identified as African American, 36 identified as Hispanic, 18 identified as Asian American, and one identified as American Indian/Alaska Native.

Performing arts
The school has two competitive show choirs, the mixed-gender "Brio" and the all-female "Bellas". In 2020, Brio won a competition in Madison, Connecticut.

Notable alumni
Demario Davis, NFL linebacker for the New Orleans Saints
J. T. Ginn, NCAA pitcher for the Mississippi State Bulldogs
Michael Guest, Member of the U.S. House of Representatives from Mississippi's 3rd Congressional District
Brent Leach, former MLB pitcher
Gardner Minshew, NFL quarterback for the Philadelphia Eagles
Jerious Norwood, former NFL running back
Will Rogers, current quarterback of the Mississippi State Bulldogs.
Barry Wesson, former MLB outfielder

References

Public high schools in Mississippi
Schools in Rankin County, Mississippi
Brandon, Mississippi